Bahr Mill Complex is a historic grist mill complex located in Colebrookdale Township, Berks County, Pennsylvania.  The complex includes the 2-story, plus basement, banked stone mill (1897); 2 2/2-story, stucco over stone farmhouse (c. 1820); 1-story, brick smokehouse (c. 1820); banked frame sawmill with a stone foundation (c. 1820); 2-story, stucco over stone store (c. 1820); two sheds (c. 1890); a shoemaker's shop (c. 1890); outhouse (c. 1920); stone bank barn (rebuilt c. 1880); and frame garage (c. 1930).  Also on the property are a contributing chicken house (c. 1850) and pig sty (c. 1890).  It is a family-run mill complex, run by the Gable family for over 175 years.

It was listed on the National Register of Historic Places in 1990.

References

External links
 Bahr's Mill - official site

Grinding mills in Berks County, Pennsylvania
Grinding mills on the National Register of Historic Places in Pennsylvania
Museums in Berks County, Pennsylvania
Mill museums in Pennsylvania
1897 establishments in Pennsylvania
National Register of Historic Places in Berks County, Pennsylvania